Lalchand Sitaram Rajput; (born 18 December 1961) is an Indian cricket coach and former cricketer who was also the former head coach of the Zimbabwe national team.

Rajput played in two Tests and four ODIs from 1985 to 1987. After the conclusion of his playing career, he served as manager of the Indian national team for a brief period, and also coached Afghanistan from 2016 to 2017. He has also held administrative positions with the Mumbai Cricket Association.

Playing career 

Rajput had a distinguished career as an opening batsman for Bombay, and at one time was considered one of the best openers  in India after Sunil Gavaskar. However, he did not translate his promise and success at the domestic level to the international arena, in the limited opportunities he had. He was an occasional off-spinner.

Coaching career 

Rajput attended a coaching clinic held at Bangalore in April 2007. He was coach of Under-19 Indian Cricket Team during the tour of England. Rajput was appointed as the manager of the World Cup winning Indian cricket team for the 2007 Twenty20 World Championship held in South Africa.

Rajput was the coach of the Mumbai Indians in the Indian Premier League 2008. He was caught on camera laughing when Harbhajan Singh slapped Sreesanth after a match between Mumbai Indians and Kings XI Punjab. The BCCI expressed it was shameful that Rajput was laughing on witnessing the incident. It was expected that BCCI would take strong action against Rajput.

In June 2016, Rajput was named as head coach of Afghanistan's national team, replacing Pakistan's Inzamam ul Haq; during his spell in charge, they defeated West Indies in a one-day international at Gros Islet and were promoted to Full Membership of the International Cricket Council.  But his contract was ended by the Afghan board in August 2017; he was later replaced by Phil Simmons.

In May 2018, he was named as the interim head coach of the Zimbabwe national cricket team. In August 2018, he was appointed to the role on a permanent basis. In June 2019, he was named as the coach of the Winnipeg Hawks franchise team for the 2019 Global T20 Canada tournament.

In March 2022, Zimbabwe Cricket decided to extend the contract with him and he served as the head coach of Zimbabwe up until early June 2022. Following the conclusion of Zimbabwe's home series against Afghanistan, he was subsequently replaced by Dave Houghton as the new head coach of Zimbabwe.

References

External links
  

1961 births
Living people
Cricketers from Mumbai
India Test cricketers
India One Day International cricketers
West Zone cricketers
East Zone cricketers
Scotland cricketers
Mumbai cricketers
Assam cricketers
Vidarbha cricketers
Coaches of the Indian national cricket team
Indian Premier League coaches
Indian cricket coaches
Coaches of the Afghanistan national cricket team
Indian expatriates in Afghanistan
Coaches of the Zimbabwe national cricket team